Siti Adiyati Subangun (born 2 October 1951), often just known as Siti Adiyati, is a prolific Indonesian Contemporary artist, historically significant as one of the founding members of the Indonesian New Art Movement (Indonesian: Gerakan Seni Rupa Baru (GSRB)) from 1975 to 1979. She is notable as one of the few women artists involved with the GSRB, alongside Nanik Mirna, with most of the individuals behind the movement being young male artists from Bandung, Jakarta, and Yogyakarta. In her practice as an artist, educator, writer, and activist, Siti Adiyati examines issues of social inequality, environmental degradation, and bureaucratic corruption.

Through her activity with GSRB, an "academic rebellion" that engendered an important shift within the history Indonesian contemporary art, Siti Adiyati played a significant role in pushing for the separation of Indonesian art from institutional bureaucracy.

Education and personal life 
A student of the Akademi Seni Rupa Indonesia (ASRI) in Yogyakarta, Siti Adiyati was part of a growing opposition on campus—alongside fellow ASRI students and artists FX Harsono, Hardi, Bonyong Munni Ardhie, and Nanik Mirna—against the dominant conceptions of fine art that were then being enforced by the curriculum, where art schools such as ASRI and the Institut Teknologi Bandung (ITB) in Bandung advocated for fine art as being limited to mediums such as painting and sculpture.

By 1972, Siti Adiyati, alongside the four other artists, formed one of the main groups making calls for a renewal in ideas towards Indonesian art and its production, becoming catalysts for debate and discussion among ASRI students at the time. They were main organisers of a student study club on campus that had close connections with literature lecturers, students, and other intellectuals from the Gadjah Mada University (UGM) in Yogyakarta, sharing ideas and accessing books beyond their academy's curriculum. Together, the group organised campus talks by Indonesian and international speakers that circulated concepts from Western contemporary art, and they served as editors on the campus publication, Journal of Art (Jurnal Seni). From 1972 to 1974, Siti Adiyati would exhibit together with the four other artists under the name of Group of Five (Kelompok Lima) and Five Painters (Pelukis Lima).

Career

Black December (Desember Hitam), 1974 

In 1974, Siti Adiyati was involved in the Black December (Desember Hitam) student protest, notably one of the few female participants. The Black December event was incited by skewed judging for the second iteration of The Grand Painting Exhibition of Jakarta (Pameran Besar Seni Lukis Indonesia), held from 18 to 31 December 1974 as part of the larger Art Festival ’74 (Pesta Seni 74). Here, Siti Adiyati and her group of peers exhibited mixed media works, collages, and other two-dimensional works that did not fall neatly within conventional classifications of painting. Such works were judged as inappropriate at a national exhibition seeking to represent a national artistic identity—they were deemed as artistically immature, overly reliant on foreign trends, and being art for art's sake.

During the closing ceremony on 31 December 1974, the Black December protest was staged by Siti Adiyati and the four other participating ASRI students, alongside nine other participants from beyond ASRI. They first sent a funeral wreath to the awards ceremony with the statement "condolences on the death of Indonesian painting" ("Ikut berduka cita atas kematian seni lukis kita"), then attempted to hand out a jointly-written and signed Black December Statement before being forced out of the room. Notably, the statement had been signed by other graduates, writers, poets, playwrights and Actors, indicating that Siti Adiyati and the demonstrators were playing a role in much a wider cultural movement. The fifth and final point of the statement, for instance, outlined:That which has hindered the development of Indonesian painting for far too long is the obsolete concepts that are still adhered to by the ‘establishment’, by entrepreneurs in culture, and already established artists. For the sake of saving Indonesian painting it is time to give our respects to this establishment, namely to bid farewell to those who were once engaged in the battle for cultural art. The students' efforts were condemned and dismissed as immature, and interpreted as an attack on national culture. It further prompted the involvement of Ali Sadikin, then-Governor of Jakarta, as well as the Ministry of Education and Culture, which sent down a representative to investigate, demonstrative of the wider distrust of student activity beyond the campus that emerged during the New Order era. A committee was set up to interrogate the involved ASRI students, and Siti Adiyati received an academic penalty for her involvement.

Gerakan Seni Rupa Baru (GSRB), 1975–79 

With the help of art critic Sanento Yuliman, Siti Adiyati and the ASRI cohort involved in Black December came together with ASRI graduate Martoyo Hartoyo, and like-minded ITB students Bachtiar Zainul, Pandu Sudewo, Prayinto, and Jim Supangkat to organise what was initially called the New Art Group (Kelompok Seni Rupa Baru). They would stage four exhibitions from August 1975 to October 1979, three of which took place at the Taman Ismail Marzuki Cultural Center (TIM). 

They would not call themselves GSRB until their final exhibition in 1979, which was when the group also published their manifesto, Five Lines of Attack of the New Indonesian Art Movement (Lima Jurus Gebrakan Gerakan Seni Rupa Baru). After gaining and losing members, GSRB would consist of 28 individuals by the final exhibition. Siti Adiyati was thus active member of GSRB, organising and showing work across this period of activity.

Art

Dolonan (Toys), 1977 
In her 1977 installation, Dolonan (Toys), Siti Ardyati appropriates the iconography of wayang, often discussed as a court tradition and a form of 'high' culture. In contrast to courtly wayang kulit, which features lamb-skin leather puppets that are ornately painted on one side, Siti Adiyati's installation featured small wayang figures made of plastic, alongside other ornamental objects used as toys for children. These materials were hung from or attached to a standing cuboid structure made of four wooden planks and rows of white fabric attached around them. Such materials serve to dissolve the boundaries of 'high' and 'low' culture, situating court traditions within the realm of the everyday, as a form that is not immune to commodification for mass consumption and tourist trade, or being instrumentalised in official constructions of national culture. 

Siti Adiyati argued that the younger generation no longer related to the glorified past of Javanese court traditions, and that artists should engage with such histories in relation to their own experiences. Correspondingly, the work engages with the notion of 'tradition' by complicating its associations with 'high' culture, emphasising how wayang and its narratives have continually been represented and remediated through Indonesian popular culture, such comic books, cartoons, and television and radio.

Eceng Gondok Berbungan Emas (Water Hyacinth with Golden Roses), 1979 
First shown in Jakarta in 1979 for one of the Gerakan Seni Rupa Baru exhibitions at the Taman Ismail Marzuki, the installation Eceng Gondok Berbungan Emas (Water Hyacinth with Golden Roses) served as a critique of then-president Suharto's New Order and the social inequalities that it produced. The only work in the exhibition that used a living organism, it featured a body of water with its surface covered by eceng gondok, a type of water hyacinth that is an invasive species to the Southeast Asian region, a floating aquatic weed with a high rate of reproduction. Rising above the water hyacinth were gold plastic roses, a contrast that sought to emphasise the New Order as "just an illusion symbolised by the golden rose in the sea of absolute poverty that the eceng gondok represents."

In the 70s, the socioeconomic divide in Indonesia had become increasingly pronounced, with the New Order's 1967 Foreign Investment Law bringing new business opportunities for the people and the military. The rose, for instance, was popular with upper-class Indonesians in Jakarta as an imported luxury good, with a single stalk equal in price to a kilogram of rice. Such would have been a significant amount of money for many of the poor in Jakarta who struggled to afford rice as a daily need. While roses served decorative purposes for the wealthy and powerful, the hyacinth could be transformed from a weed to be used as organic fertiliser and animal feed. This symbolised the durability and capacity of the Indonesian people in the face of Suharto's authoritarian New Order.

Eceng Gondok Berbungan Emas was recreated and shown at the Jakarta Biennale 2017, and also recreated as part of the travelling exhibition, Awakenings: Art in Society in Asia, 1960s–1990s, which was shown in 2019 at the National Museum of Modern Art, Tokyo (MOMAT), the National Museum of Modern and Contemporary Art, Korea (MMCA), and the National Gallery Singapore.

References

External links 
Siti Adiyati at the Jakarta Biennale 2017 (archived)

1951 births
Living people
Indonesian artists
Indonesian women artists